The EWF Cruiserweight Championship was a professional wrestling title for the cruiserweight division (220 lbs. and under) in the Southern California-based Empire Wrestling Federation independent promotion. It was established in 2004, with Liger Rivera as the first champion, who defeated Kid Karnage,  Ryan Taylor and Jung Lee to win it. There have been a total of 14 recognized champions who have had a combined 19 official reigns.

Title History

References

Cruiserweight wrestling championships
Empire Wrestling Federation championships